Deadly Strangers is a 1975 British psychological thriller film directed by Sidney Hayers and starring Hayley Mills, Simon Ward and Sterling Hayden.

Plot
An unseen dangerous patient escapes Greenwood Mental Hospital killing or injuring two staff. Soon afterwards, in a private house, a couple discovers that their bedroom has been burgled. A motorist stops at a telephone box, and his unattended car is stolen by an unseen thief who runs over the owner, killing him.

The next day a man in his thirties, Stephen Slade, notices an attractive young woman, Belle Adams, in a pub, and when she is given a lift by a lorry driver, he follows her in his own car, which is the same color and make (an Austin Maxi) as seen in the earlier murder scene. The lorry driver attempts to rape the girl but she escapes and is rescued by Stephen.

Belle wishes to catch a train at a nearby station and Stephen drives her there; but on arrival he untruthfully claims her train is not running and offers to drive her to her destination instead.

With Stephen not being too forthcoming on his own background, the trip focuses on what they are both hiding. Flashbacks gradually reveal that Stephen is a voyeur deeply into sexual perversions, and that Belle is an orphan who was a victim of sexual abuse on the part of her uncle who used to watch her undress through peepholes in the wall and walk in on her as she bathed. At an isolated petrol station manned only by one young woman, Stephen fills up his tank, disappears for a while in the petrol station ostensibly to make a telephone call, and then rejoins Belle in the car, and they drive off. The next scene shows the petrol station attendant murdered.

On the road, Stephen and Belle are keen to avoid police checks and roadblocks, at first because Stephen was drinking alcohol, and then because the couple are harassed by two young motorcyclists and Stephen knocks one of them into the roadside where he lies motionless, presumably injured or dead. To avoid detection Stephen and Belle sleep in the car. On waking the next morning, Stephen notices Belle has disappeared and drives off to find her, assuming disloyalty. She however has simply been shopping for breakfast and so is obliged to catch a lift from aging Malcolm Robarts. Before long Stephen reunites with Belle, leaving Robarts alone. Upon seeing a newspaper headline, Robarts tries to chase them but loses them.

The film culminates with the couple spending the night at a hotel. A flashback reveals the truth: after sexual abuse by her uncle during her orphaned childhood, Belle snapped and murdered her uncle, which resulted in her confinement in Greenwood Mental Hospital. Now, Belle is finally arrested by the police, but not before she murders Stephen. The title is explained: they were both deadly strangers.

Cast
Belle Adams - 	Hayley Mills
Stephen Slade - 	Simon Ward
Malcolm Robarts - 	Sterling Hayden
Jim Nicholls - 	Ken Hutchison
Belle's Uncle - 	Peter Jeffrey
Café Owner - 	Hubert Tucker
Petrol Station Attendant - 	Nina Francis
1st Motorcycle Youth - 	George Collis
2nd Motorcycle Youth - 	Ralph Arliss
Stephen's Girlfriend - 	Juliet Aykroyd
Motorcycle Policeman - 	Roger Nott
Hotel Receptionist - 	Norman Tyrrell

Filming locations
The film credits state that all filming was conducted in the West Country. Specifically, the locations have been identified as Bristol and Somerset.

Critical reception
Time Out noted "old-fashioned psychopathic goings-on in the West Country" and its "sole redeeming feature is Hayley Mills, who suggests an actress capable of much better things than she has been offered recently. Hayers, to his credit, does exploit her best quality - an insolent, slightly offhand sex appeal" ; while TV Guide found it an "occasionally intriguing tale," concluding that it was "well done, but it seems to bog down in its own cleverness"; whereas The Terror Trap found it "a satisfying and well made British psycho thriller." Filmink criticised the story.

External links

Deadly Strangers at Reel Streets

References

1975 films
1970s crime thriller films
1970s psychological thriller films
British thriller films
Films directed by Sidney Hayers
Films scored by Ron Goodwin
1970s English-language films
1970s British films